Rás 1 (Channel 1) is an Icelandic radio station belonging to and operated by Ríkisútvarpið (RÚV), Iceland's national public service broadcaster. Broadcast throughout Iceland on FM (92.4 and 93.5 MHz in Reykjavík), via satellite and also 189 kHz longwave, it is currently among the country's most listened-to radio stations.

History

Having been on the air since 20 December 1930, using the call-sign Útvarp Reykjavík (Radio Reykjavík), the station adopted its present name on 1 December 1983 when RÚV began transmitting a second radio channel, which is known as Rás 2.

Programming
Rás 1 carries primarily news, weather, current affairs coverage, and cultural programming dealing with the arts, history, the Icelandic language, literature, and social and environmental issues.

See also
 Bylgjan
 Rás 2

References

External links
 

1930 establishments in Iceland
Companies based in Reykjavík
Radio stations established in 1930
Radio stations in Iceland